Erin Lawless (born May 6, 1985), also known as Erin Lawlessová, is an American born-Slovak women's basketball player. She played for Slovakia at EuroBasket Women 2011, where she was her nation's top scorer. She played club basketball in Italy, Slovakia, Russia, Turkey and Belgium between 2007 and 2015, before returning to the United States.

Basketball career
Lawless signed a letter of intent with Purdue in 2002, having played basketball for Fenwick High School.

Lawless played basketball in Italy's Serie A1 with New Wash Montigarda in the 2007–08 season, leading the team in scoring. She then signed with the Indiana Fever of the WNBA in early 2008, making it her second training camp with the team.

Lawless subsequently moved to Slovakia to play in the Slovak Women's Basketball Extraliga for Prešov and then Good Angels Košice. In 2010 she received Slovak citizenship, enabling her to represent Slovakia in international competition, despite not being able to speak the Slovak language. She played three matches for Slovakia at EuroBasket Women 2011, leading the individual scoring with a total of 34 points. Slovakia won one and lost two matches in the group stage, ending their tournament.

After spending some time in the Russian league with Dynamo Kursk, Lawless joined Turkish side Ceyhan in 2013. In September 2014 Lawless joined Belgian side BC Namur-Capitale, but fractured her thumb shortly after her arrival. Her contract with Namur was terminated in February 2015, with Lawless pregnant, and she returned to the United States.

Purdue statistics

Source

References

External links
Profile at purduesports.com

1985 births
Living people
American emigrants to Slovakia
American expatriate basketball people in Belgium
American expatriate basketball people in Italy
American expatriate basketball people in Russia
American expatriate basketball people in Slovakia
American expatriate basketball people in Turkey
American women's basketball players
Basketball players from Chicago
Purdue Boilermakers women's basketball players
Slovak people of American descent
Slovak women's basketball players
Slovak expatriate basketball people in Turkey
Slovak expatriate basketball people in Russia
Slovak expatriate basketball people in Belgium
Slovak expatriate basketball people in Italy
Forwards (basketball)